Lungga (also spelled Luga, Luqa) is a Malayo-Polynesian language spoken by about 2,800 people on the southern half of Ranongga Island, Solomon Islands.

References

Languages of the Solomon Islands
Northwest Solomonic languages